Duwet, also known as Guwot or Waing, is an aberrant member of the Busu subgroup of Lower Markham languages in Morobe Province, Papua New Guinea. Duwet is spoken by about 400 people and appears to have been heavily influenced by its neighboring Nabak language (also called Wain) of the Papuan Trans–New Guinea languages. It is spoken in the three villages of Lambaip, Lawasumbileng, and Ninggiet.

Duwet is spoken in the three villages of Lambaip, Lawasumbileng, and Ninggiet in Nabak Rural LLG.

Morphology

Pronouns and person markers

Subject prefixes

Numerals
Traditional Duwet numerals include only three basic forms: 'one', 'two', and 'hand (= five)'.

References

 Holzknecht, Susanne (2001). "Number and Person in the Duwet Language of Papua New Guinea." In Andrew Pawley, Malcolm Ross, and Darrell Tryon, eds., The Boy from Bundaberg: Studies in Melanesian Linguistics in Honour of Tom Dutton, 175-191. Canberra: Pacific Linguistics.

Markham languages
Languages of Morobe Province
Vulnerable languages